"Let It Roll" is a 1989 single by DJ/producer, Doug Lazy.  The single was the first of three number-one dance singles for Lazy.  "Let It Roll" went to number one for one week in August 1989.

Charts

References

1989 singles
Raze (group) songs
Hip house songs
1989 songs